MVA is a transportation, planning and management consultant established in Asia since the 1970s. Headquartered in Hong Kong, it operates in Hong Kong, China, Singapore, Thailand, India, Vietnam, Indonesia, Malaysia, The Philippines, Australia and New Zealand.  It is part of the SYSTRA group.

Its head office is in the Genesis Building in Wong Chuk Hang, Hong Kong Island.

History 

MVA started in 1968 as "Alan M. Voorhees and Associates", a UK subsidiary of American Transport Consultants, and was appointed to undertake a transport study for Tyne and Wear Metropolitan Council. Brian Martin, who had been Greater London Council (GLC)'s Chief Transport Planner, was appointed as Managing Director of Voorhees' UK operations and after some years the company was renamed Martin and Voorhees Associates in recognition of his role.

In 1983, the management of Martin and Voorhees Associates bought the company from its American owners and the company's name was changed to MVA.

Services 
MVA provides consulting services in Asia region for on traffic engineering, transport planning & management and market & business research, for both public and private sectors with specialisation on:

 Land-use Development and Master Planning
 Transport Planning and Policy
 Sustainable Transport
 Traffic and Highway Engineering
 Rail Planning and Station Design
 Public Transport
 Non-Motorised Transport (NMT)
 Transport Investment Projects
 Transport Modelling and Simulation
 Business, Market and Social Research

Awards 
MVA as Traffic Consultant: 
 2021 RIBA International Awards for Excellence - Tai Kwun - The Centre for Heritage and Arts
2020 Quality Building Award - Hong Kong Children's Hospital
2020 HKIA Merit Award of Mixed-Uses(es) Building - Tai Kwun - The Centre for Heritage and Arts
2020 HKIA Special Award of Heritage & Adaptive Re-use - Tai Kwun - The Centre for Heritage and Arts
2019 HKIA Merit Award of Hong Kong – Community - West Kowloon Cultural District - Xiqu Centre
2019 Green Building Award - Merit Award - Phase III Campus Development for OUHK
2018 Strategic Cooperation Excellence Award - Shenzhen Prince Bay Area
2014 Green Building Award - THEi New Campus at Chai Wan
2014 MTR Grand Safety Award - SCL 1109 Stations and Tunnels of Kowloon City Section
2014 Quality Building Award - The New Campuses of Hong Kong Design Institute & Hong Kong Institute of Vocational Education (Lee Wai Lee)

References

External links 
 MVA Asia website (in English)
 MVA website (in Simplified Chinese)
 MVA website (for India)

Transport companies of Hong Kong